Zingem Heliport  is a private heliport located near Zingem, East Flanders, Belgium.

See also
List of airports in Belgium

References

External links 
 Airport record for Zingem Heliport at Landings.com

Airports in East Flanders